Nora Watkins (née Hetherington) (born  in New Zealand) is a former association football player who represented New Zealand at international level.

Watkins made her Football Ferns debut in their first ever international as they beat Hong Kong 2–0 on 25 August 1975 at the inaugural AFC Women's Asian Cup. She finished her international career with 10 caps and 2 goal to her credit.

Honours

New Zealand
AFC Women's Championship: 1975

References

Year of birth missing (living people)
Living people
New Zealand women's association footballers
New Zealand women's international footballers
Women's association footballers not categorized by position
New Zealand women's national football team managers